Harirampur is an upazila of Manikganj District in the Division of Dhaka, Bangladesh.

Geography
It has 30,136 households and a total area of 245.42 km2.

Demographics
According to the 2001 Bangladesh census, Harirampur had a population of 281,274. Males constituted 84,994, and females 86,280. The population of those aged 18 and older was 115,752. Harirampur had an average literacy rate of 30.2% (7+ years), against the national average of 32.4%.

Administration
Harirampur Upazila is divided into 13 union parishads: Azimnagar, Balara, Balla, Boyra, Chala, Dhulsunra, Gala, Gopinathpur, Harukandi, Kanchanpur, Lesraganj, Ramkrishnapur, and Sutalari. The union parishads are subdivided into 196 mauzas and 250 villages.

Education
There are many educational institutes in Harirampur Upazila.
There are three colleges in the upazila.[4]
Jhitka Khawja Rahamat Ali Degree College.
M.A Rouf Degree College, Kowri.  
Govt. Justice Nurul Islam College
 Ibrahimpur Ishwar Chandra High School
 Jhitka Anando Mohan High School.
 Jhitka Pilot Girls High School.
 Patgram Anath Bandhu Government High School.
 Diabari High School.
 Jatrapur High School.
 Ramkrishnapur M A Jalil High School.
Mohiuddin kamol high school

Primary Schools-

1.Dorikandi Government primary school. 

2.Adhermanik model Govt. primary school. 

3. Balurchar Government primary school. 

4. Bhatikandi Govt. Primary school
 
5. Sutalori Govt. Primary school

See also
 Upazilas of Bangladesh
 Districts of Bangladesh
 Divisions of Bangladesh

References

Upazilas of Manikganj District